Holstebro station ( or Holstebro Station) is a railway station serving the town of Holstebro in Jutland, Denmark.

Holstebro station is a railway junction where the Vejle-Holstebro Line and the Esbjerg-Struer Line meet. The station was opened in 1866 with the opening of the Struer-Holstebro section of the Esbjerg-Struer Line. The station building was designed by the Danish architect Heinrich Wenck. It offers direct InterCityLyn services to Copenhagen operated by DSB as well as regional train services to Skjern, Fredericia, Aarhus and Struer operated by Arriva.

Architecture 
The original station building from 1866 was designed by the Danish architect Niels Peder Christian Holsøe. It was replaced by the current station building designed by Heinrich Wenck in 1904. The station building was listed in 1992.

See also
 List of railway stations in Denmark

References

Citations

Bibliography

External links

 Banedanmark – government agency responsible for maintenance and traffic control of most of the Danish railway network
 DSB – largest Danish train operating company
 Arriva – British multinational public transport company operating bus and train services in Denmark
 Danske Jernbaner – website with information on railway history in Denmark

Railway stations opened in 1866
Railway stations in the Central Denmark Region
Holstebro
Railway stations in Denmark opened in the 19th century